Monday Morning in a Coney Island Police Court is a 1908 American silent short comedy film directed by D. W. Griffith.

Cast
 John R. Cumpson as Honorable Patrick McPheeney
 Harry Solter as McPheeney's Aide
 Edward Dillon
 George Gebhardt as Happy Hooligan Character
 Robert Harron as Young Man
 Dell Henderson
 Anthony O'Sullivan as Ignatius O'Brien, Attorney
 Mack Sennett as Policeman

References

External links
 

1908 films
1908 comedy films
Silent American comedy films
American silent short films
American black-and-white films
Films directed by D. W. Griffith
1908 short films
American comedy short films
1900s American films